Andrew Kenneth Pawley (born 1941 in Sydney), FRSNZ, FAHA, is Emeritus Professor at the School of Culture, History & Language of the College of Asia & the Pacific at the Australian National University.

Career
Pawley was born in Sydney but moved to New Zealand at the age of 12. He was educated at the University of Auckland, gaining a PhD in anthropology in 1966. 

His doctoral thesis, The structure of Karam: a grammar of a New Guinea Highlands language, was dedicated to Kalam, a Papuan (Trans–New Guinea) language of Papua New Guinea.

He taught linguistics in the Department of Anthropology, University of Auckland from 1965 to 1989, with periods at the University of Papua New Guinea (1969) and the University of Hawaii (1973 to 1978). He moved to the Australian National University in 1990. He has taught at the Linguistic Society of America's Summer Institute in 1977 and 1985. Pawley took sabbaticals at Berkeley (1983), Frankfurt (1994) and Max Planck Institute for Evolutionary Anthropology, Leipzig (2001). Currently, he is Professor Emeritus at Australian National University's College of Asia and the Pacific.

Research
Pawley's research interests include Austronesian and Papuan languages and cultures, the prehistory of Pacific Island peoples, folk taxonomies and ethnobiology, lexicography, phraseology and idiomaticity.

Andrew Pawley has completed dictionaries of Wayan (an Oceanic language of Western Fiji); and of Kalam (a Papuan language of Papua New Guinea), in collaboration with Ian Saem Majnep.

Since the mid-1990s, he has been collaborating with Malcolm Ross and Meredith Osmond on the Oceanic Lexicon Project, an encyclopedic series using lexical comparisons to reconstruct the culture and environment of Proto-Oceanic speakers. Five volumes have been published, in 1998, 2003, 2008, 2016.

Key publications
Between 1960 and 2010, Andrew Pawley published 196 academic publications:
 21 publications on Polynesian languages and culture history,
 14 on Fijian and Rotuman languages,
 53 on Austronesian, especially Oceanic, languages and their culture history,
 29 on Papuan languages, including 19 on Kalam.
 44 on varieties of English, discourse and pragmatics,
 35 on miscellaneous topics.

Among these, the most important ones include:
 Pawley, Andrew. 1966. Samoan Phrase Structure: the Morphology-Syntax of a Western Polynesian Language. Bloomington: Indiana University Archives of Languages of the World, 1966.
Pawley, Andrew (with Malcolm Ross and Meredith Osmond, eds.) The Lexicon of Proto Oceanic: The culture and environment of ancestral Oceanic society (5 volumes). Canberra: Pacific Linguistics.
Pawley, Andrew (with Ralph Bulmer, with the assistance of John Kias, Simon Peter Gi and Ian Saem Majnep). 2011. A dictionary of Kalam with ethnographic notes. Canberra: Pacific Linguistics.

Notes and references

Notes

References

External links
 Andrew Pawley's academic profile (homepage of the Australian National University).

1941 births
Living people
Linguists of Austronesian languages
Linguists from Australia
Linguists of Papuan languages
Ethnobiologists
Academic staff of the University of Papua New Guinea
Paleolinguists
Historical linguists